Karl Allmendinger (3 February 1891 – 2 October 1965) was a general in the Wehrmacht of Nazi Germany during World War II. He commanded the 5th Infantry Division, V Army Corps then 17th Army on the Eastern Front. He was a recipient of the  Knight's Cross of the Iron Cross with Oak Leaves.

Career
Allmendinger was appointed to command the 5th Infantry Division as a Generalmajor on 25 October 1940. His division was committed to the invasion of the Soviet Union in June 1941, and he was awarded the Knight's Cross of the Iron Cross on 17 July. He was promoted to Generalleutnant on 1 August 1942, and was awarded the Oak Leaves to his Knight's Cross on 13 December 1942. He was relieved of command of the division on 4 January 1943. 

On 1 July 1943 he was recalled into active service and appointed commanding general of the V Army Corps which operated in the Crimea. Assigned to command the 17th Army in early May 1944, his mission was to evacuate Sevastopol and lead his units back to Romania across the Black Sea. Considerable losses in men and material were suffered. 

On 25 July 1944, Allmendinger was again relieved from command and transferred to the Führerreserve, where he remained without further assignment until the end of the war. 
He was arrested by U.S. forces in 1945 but released in 1946.

Awards

 Clasp to the Iron Cross (1939) 2nd Class (20 September 1939) & 1st Class (21 May 1940)

 Knight's Cross of the Iron Cross with Oak Leaves
 Knight's Cross on 17 July 1941 as Generalmajor and commander of the 5. Infanterie-Division
 153rd Oak Leaves on 13 December 1942 as Generalleutnant and commander of the 5. Jäger-Division

3rd Class of the Lithuanian Grand Duke Gediminas Order (16 February 1928)

References

Citations

Bibliography

 
 
 
 

1891 births
1965 deaths
People from Ostalbkreis
People from the Kingdom of Württemberg
German Army generals of World War II
Generals of Infantry (Wehrmacht)
German Army personnel of World War I
Recipients of the clasp to the Iron Cross, 1st class
Recipients of the Knight's Cross of the Iron Cross with Oak Leaves
Recipients of the Order of the Cross of Liberty, 1st Class
German prisoners of war in World War II held by the United States
20th-century Freikorps personnel
Military personnel from Baden-Württemberg